Marcelle Soares-Santos is a Brazilian physicist who works as assistant professor of Physics and Experimental Cosmology and Astrophysics at the University of Michigan.

Biography 
Marcelle was born in Vitória, Brazil, in 1983. Two years later, her family moved to Parauapebas, in the Carajás Mountains, in the State of Pará. She graduated in Physics at the Federal University of Espírito Santo (Ufes) in 2004. She then pursued a Master's degree and Doctorate in Astronomy at the University of São Paulo (USP), defending her Doctorate dissertation in 2010.

In 2010 Soares-Santos became a Research Associate in Astrophysics at the Fermi National Accelerator Laboratory, in Batavia, near Chicago. Her research at Fermilab was focused on the characteristics of gravitational waves and in dark energy. There, Soares-Santos contributed to the construction of the Dark Energy Camera, one of the largest telescope cameras in the world, which she employed to search for gravitational wave-emitting collisions of neutron stars and black holes. Her work at the Fermilab was rewarded: in 2014, she was bestowed the Alvin Tollestrup Award for her postdoctoral research. Work at Fermilab continued until 2017, when she became assistant professor of Physics in Brandeis University.

In 2019, the Alfred P. Sloan Foundation awarded Marcelle Soares-Santos a Sloan Research Fellowship, one of the most competitive and prestigious awards available to early-career researchers. In 2020 she became assistant professor in the University of Michigan at Ann Arbor.

References

External links 

 Oral history interview transcript with Marcelle Soares-Santos on 12 March 2021, American Institute of Physics, Niels Bohr Library & Archives

21st-century Brazilian women scientists
21st-century Brazilian physicists
Brandeis University faculty
University of São Paulo alumni
Women physicists
Sloan Research Fellows
1983 births
Living people
People from Vitória, Espírito Santo
University of Michigan faculty
People from Pará
Brazilian expatriate academics in the United States